Clifford Morris Hardin (October 9, 1915April 4, 2010) was an American politician and was the Chancellor of the University of Nebraska.  He served as the United States Secretary of Agriculture from 1969 to 1971 under President Richard Nixon.

Biography
Hardin was born in Knightstown, Indiana, on October 9, 1915, to J. Alvin and Mabel (née Macy) Hardin.  He earned a B.S. (1937), M.S. (1939) and Ph.D. (1941) from Purdue University in West Lafayette, Indiana. On June 28, 1939, Hardin married the former Martha Love Wood. They had two sons and three daughters.

He taught Agricultural Economics at the Michigan State University of Lansing from 1944 to 1948, when he became the assistant director and then the director of the Agricultural Experiment Station. He did some post-doctoral work during the 1940s at the University of Chicago where he did research in agricultural economics with future Nobel Prize winner, Theodore Schultz. Hardin became the school's Dean of Agriculture in 1953 and was the Chancellor of the University of Nebraska from 1954 to 1968.

On January 21, 1969, Hardin served as the U.S. Secretary of Agriculture by President Richard Nixon. As the Secretary, Hardin extended the food stamp program and established both the Food and Nutrition Service (to administer the food programs for the poor) and the Office of Intergovernmental Affairs (to coordinate the efforts of state and local officials). Hardin resigned on November 17, 1971, and was replaced by Earl L. Butz.

Hardin died from kidney disease and congestive heart failure in Lincoln, Nebraska, on April 4, 2010, at the age of 94.

His daughter, Nancy H. Rogers, married Douglas L. Rogers, the son of Secretary of State William P. Rogers. His other daughter, Cynthia H. Milligan, was married to Robert Milligan.

References

Clifford M. Hardin's obituary
Obituary - New York Times
Former UNL chancellor, ag secretary Hardin dies at 94

1915 births
2010 deaths
Michigan State University faculty
Nixon administration cabinet members
20th-century American politicians
People from Knightstown, Indiana
Purdue University alumni
United States Secretaries of Agriculture
Presidents of the University of Nebraska System
Chancellors of the University of Nebraska-Lincoln
Nebraska politicians